John Launder (1530–1555) was an English Protestant martyr. He was executed in 1555 during a period of religious persecutions in England.

There is a memorial to John Launder in Steyning where he was martyred. The memorial is pictured on the website of Steyning Museum; The event of his martyring has been described as "one of the darkest days in Steyning's 1200 year history."

References

1530 births
1555 deaths
English Protestants
Protestant martyrs of England
16th-century English people
People executed by the Kingdom of England by burning
Executed British people
People executed for heresy
16th-century Protestant martyrs
People executed under Mary I of England